is a Japanese publisher.  He founded the monthly magazine Pia in 1972 when he was still a student at Chuo University.

References

External links

1950 births
Living people